Anita Das (1 October 1953 – 11 May 2018) was an Indian film and television actress in Odia cinema. She received three Odisha State Film Awards during her career. Das died of cardiac arrest which resulted from a heart attack on 11MMay, ay 2018 at the age of 64.

Career 
Anita Das made her acting debut in 1975, in the Odia film, Jajabara where she played the lead role. She predominantly appeared in more than a hundred movies since then, mostly in supporting roles as a mother. She was quite popular for essaying the role of mother in most of her films after the 1980s.

Das received the Odisha State Film Award (Best Actress) for her acting in the film, Tapasya in 1980 and also received the prestigious award again for her lead role in the 1983 film, Bhakta Salabeg. She also won the Odisha State Film Award for Best supporting actress in 1987 for her performance in the film, Eai Ta Dunia.

Death 
On 10 May, 2018, Das was reportedly complaining about her health conditions to her nephew Akash Dasnayak. She was suffering from vomiting and had heart and chest pains on Thursday night before going to sleep. Das was found dead the next day after Dasnayak rushed to call a doctor to consult her for treatments.

Filmography

References

External links 
 

1951 births
2018 deaths
Actresses in Odia cinema
Actresses from Odisha
Indian film actresses
Odia people
21st-century Indian actresses